The Galle Gladiators (GG) is the franchise cricket team based in Galle, Southern Province, Sri Lanka which has been playing in the Lanka Premier League (LPL) since the first edition of the tournament in 2020. They was the five teams to compete in the 2021 Lanka Premier League. The team was captained by Bhanuka Rajapaksa and coached by Umar Gul.

Current squad 
 Players with international caps are listed in bold.
  denotes a player who is currently unavailable for selection.
  denotes a player who is unavailable for rest of the season.

Administration and support staff

Teams and standings

Results by match

Points table

League stage 

The full schedule was published on the official website of Sri Lankan Cricket on 13 October 2021.

Playoffs

Qualifier 1

Final

Statistics

Most runs

Most wickets

References

2021 Lanka Premier League
Galle Gladiators